The prime minister of Serbia and Montenegro was the head of government of Serbia and Montenegro from its establishment in 1992 up until the state's dissolution in 2006. Between 1992–2003 the full name of the office was President of the Federal Government of the Federal Republic of Yugoslavia, while after the constitutional reforms of 2003 the title was Chairman of the Council of Ministers of Serbia and Montenegro (literally translated as President of the Council of Ministers of Serbia and Montenegro). The office was merged in 2003 with the head of state, providing for one person to hold both the office of President of Serbia and Montenegro and Chairman of the Council of Ministers of Serbia and Montenegro.

Prime ministers
There were five presidents of the Federal Government of the FR Yugoslavia after its assertion of independence from the SFR Yugoslavia (SFRY) in 1992 up until its dissolution in 2003. Svetozar Marović of the Democratic Party of Socialists of Montenegro was the only chairman of the Council of Ministers of Serbia and Montenegro after its constitutional reforms and reconstitution as a confederacy. He was inaugurated on March 7, 2003. After the declaration of independence of Montenegro, on June 3, 2006, the chairman of the Council of Ministers announced on June 4, 2006 the termination of his office.

Timeline

See also
 Politics of Serbia and Montenegro
 President of Serbia and Montenegro
 Prime Minister of Yugoslavia
 Prime Minister of Montenegro
 Prime Minister of Serbia

References

Serbia and Montenegro
Prime Ministers of Serbia and Montenegro
1992 establishments in Yugoslavia
2006 disestablishments in Serbia and Montenegro